Barheliya is a Syrian village in the Al-Zabadani District of the Rif Dimashq Governorate. According to the Syria Central Bureau of Statistics (CBS), Barheliya had a population of 821 in the 2004 census. Its inhabitants are predominantly Sunni Muslims.

History
Barheliya is located near Abila Lysaniou. A mosaic floor was found in Barheliya, dates back to late Roman to early Byzantine era.

References

Bibliography

Populated places in Al-Zabadani District